The 1979 Fairfield Bay Classic, also known as the Arkansas International, was a men's tennis tournament played on indoor hardcourts at Burns Park in North Little Rock, Arkansas in the United States that was part of the 1979 Grand Prix circuit. It was the sixth and final edition of the event and was held from January 29 through February 4, 1979. First-seeded Vitas Gerulaitis won the singles title and earned $11,500 first-prize money.

Finals

Singles
 Vitas Gerulaitis  defeated  Butch Walts 6–2, 6–2
 It was Gerulaitis' 1st singles title of the year and the 12th of his career.

Doubles
 Vitas Gerulaitis /  Vladimír Zedník defeated  Phil Dent /  Colin Dibley 5–7, 6–3, 7–5

References

External links
 ITF tournament edition details

Arkansas International
Arkansas International
Arkansas International